Higher self is a term associated with multiple belief systems, but its basic premise describes an eternal, omnipotent, conscious, and intelligent being, who is one's real self. Blavatsky formally defined the higher self as "Atma the inseparable ray of the Universe and one self. It is the God above, more than within, us". According to Blavatsky, each and every individual has a Higher self.

The Higher Self is generally regarded as a form of being only to be recognized in a union with a divine source. In recent years the New Age faith has encouraged the idea of the Higher Self in contemporary culture, though the notion of the Higher Self has been interpreted throughout numerous historical spiritual faiths. Some denominations believe that the higher self is a part of an individual's metaphysical identity, while others teach that the higher self is essentially our tie to the heavens. Similar to the notion of the soul, the higher self can be defined by many different sects, while also being a topic of interest in the scientific and philosophical fields.

In Islam
In Sufism and some esoteric Shia, the Higher Self has an important role, which is connected with notion of al-Insān al-Kāmil (Muhammad the Prophet), the six organs, Al-Nafsul Mud’ma’inah and Fana'.

In Hinduism
In Hinduism, the higher self is one and the same with the Jiva or individual self. With this perspective, the Hindu faith generally teaches that the higher self, or Atman is not an object possessed by an individual, rather the self is the subject which perceives. In his book, The Higher Self, Deepak Chopra utilizes the views of the Hindi denomination to support his claims concerning the divine force that is acquired with the awareness of the self. Hinduism teaches that through the examination of self-knowledge, or "atman jnana", one can attain salvation by comprehending the true self.

In Western esotericism
Aleister Crowley referred to the Higher Self as Harpocrates, which he identified as a name for the Holy Guardian Angel. In his earlier writings, Crowley states that the Holy Guardian Angel is the "silent self", the equivalent of the Genius of the Hermetic Order of the Golden Dawn, the Augoeides of Iamblichus, the Ātman of Hinduism, and the Daimon of the ancient Greeks. In his late sixties, when composing his book Magick Without Tears, he states that the Holy Guardian Angel is not one's self, but rather a discrete and independent being, who may have been previously human.

New Age
Most New Age literature defines the Higher self as an extension of the self to a godlike state. This Higher Self is essentially an extension of the worldly self. With this perspective, New Age text teaches that in exercising your relationship with the higher self, you will gain the ability to manifest your desired future before you. In other words, the self creates its own reality when in union with the Higher Self.

See also
Higher consciousness

References

Citations

Works cited

Further reading

 

Conceptions of self
New Age
New religious movements